A list of films produced in Egypt in 1990. For an A-Z list of films currently on Wikipedia, see :Category:Egyptian films.

External links
 Egyptian films of 1990 at the Internet Movie Database
 Egyptian films of 1990 elCinema.com

Lists of Egyptian films by year
1990 in Egypt
Lists of 1990 films by country or language